Black Butter Records is a British record label based in London, England. It was founded in 2010 by Olly Wood, Henry Village and Joe Gossa, 
with an investment of £5,000, and was named after a brand of condiments that had the same name. It was intended initially as an outlet for musicians who were signed to their artist management company, Stackhouse Management, and as a reaction against other labels that were "genre specific".

The label releases mostly singles, and has put out the first releases of artists including Clean Bandit, Rudimental, (both later signed with Warner) and Jessie Ware (later signed with Universal). It was awarded 'Best Small Label' at the 2012 Association of Independent Music Awards, and has been described as a "hub" of the British electronic music scene.

In 2011 the label asked, at the time unknown, Jessie Ware to vocal a track for their first signing, bass producer, RackNRuin - a track titled 'Soundclash'.

2012 saw the release of Rudimental's 'Feel The Love', feat. John Newman, earning their first UK number one that lead the way for their debu album's future platinum status.

Gorgon City released their debut single 'Real' in 2013, featuring Yasmin, followed by 'Intentions', a collaboration with Clean Bandit. This lead into their highest charting single in April 2014, 'Ready For Your Love' featuring MNEK, which featured on their debut album 'Sirens', released in October 2014.

In November 2014 it was announced that Black Butter Records had signed a new deal with Sony Music UK to become a standalone imprint under the major label. Black Butter founders Henry Village and Joe Gossa became co-presidents and Nick Worthington was announced to head up the A&R team. Sony UK's CEO Jason Iley said in a statement - “Black Butter is the most exciting label to have emerged in the last five years, so this is a real coup for us. Henry and Joe bring with them a rare talent for spotting exceptional acts. The deal is a significant benchmark in Sony Music UK’s growth plan for the future. Henry and Joe’s vision and enthusiasm is incredible and they’re the perfect fit for the new look Sony Music”.

References

British independent record labels
Record labels established in 2010
Electronic music record labels
Record labels based in London
Sony Music